Mashuna is a butterfly genus from the subfamily Satyrinae in the family Nymphalidae.

Species
Mashuna mashuna (Trimen, 1895)
Mashuna upemba (Overlaet, 1955)

External links 
 "Mashuna van Son, 1955" at Markku Savela's Lepidoptera and Some Other Life Forms

Satyrini
Butterfly genera